Tigres del Licey (English: Licey Tigers) is a professional baseball team in the Dominican Professional Baseball League (LIDOM). The team was founded in 1907 and is based in Santo Domingo, Dominican Republic. It is one of two LIDOM franchises based in the nation's capital, the other being Leones del Escogido; the two teams share Estadio Quisqueya as their home ballpark.

Tigres is the oldest team in LIDOM and has won 23 LIDOM titles and 11 Caribbean Series titles. Some of the team's best players have included Alonzo Perry, Pedro González, Manuel Mota, Guayubín Olivo, César Gerónimo, and Elvio Jiménez. Many of the best Dominican players and Major League Baseball players have taken part in the long history of the Tigres, including Tommy Lasorda, a National Baseball Hall of Fame inductee who took the team to the 1973 Caribbean World Series title. The Licey logo is a cursive "L".  The team, nicknamed "El Glorioso" (the Glorious One), has a passionate fan base.

History
The Licey team was founded as the result of a meeting that took place in the house of Vicente María Vallejo, on el Conde Street, in Santo Domingo's Colonial Zone, on November 7, 1907. The club's founding members were George and Cuncún Pou, Luis and Federico Fiallo, Luis and Pinchán Valejo, Luis Castillo, Salvador Piñeyro, Alvaro Alvarez, Tutú Martínez, Angel and Chichí Mieses, Arturo Perdomo, Bi Sanchez, Virgilio Abreu, Alberto Peña, Arturo Nolasco and Tulio Piña. Many of the founding members of the original team were also part of the first roster.

Over the next 16 years, Licey became so dominant that an agreement was made among the three other competing teams (Los Muchachos, San Carlos and Delco Lite) to form a new team, composed of their best players, in order to beat Licey. This team, called "Leones del Escogido" ( Lions of the Chosen one ), still exists, and the teams share the same stadium in Santo Domingo.

During what Dominicans call the "first stage" of the country's baseball history, games were played only during daylight hours. The game's "second stage" didn’t begin until dictator Rafael Trujillo built the capital's Estadio Quisqueya in 1955, a brilliantly designed and built stadium for the time. With the stadium came lights and what is considered the golden age of Dominican baseball.

Licey has won the Caribbean Series a record 11 times. In an unusual situation during the 2008 season, Licey finished second in the Dominican championship and would have failed to qualify for the series, but took the place of a Puerto Rican team that had withdrawn from the tournament due to financial difficulties. Licey won the series, defeating teams from Mexico and Venezuela as well as Aguilas Cibaeñas, their Dominican rivals.

Roster

Notable players and managers

Championships

External links

References

Baseball teams in the Dominican Republic
Baseball teams established in 1907
1907 establishments in the Dominican Republic
Sport in Santo Domingo